Helen Blazes may refer to:

 Lake Helen Blazes, on the St. Johns River in Florida
 Helen Blazes archaeological site, near the above lake